Paul Lecreux (18 February 1826 – 3 July 1894, in Paris) was a French sculptor working under the name Jacques France.  The museum in Rouen contains a Bust of the Republic by him, and he also produced a Marianne wearing Masonic attributes.

1826 births
1894 deaths
19th-century French sculptors
French Freemasons
French male sculptors
19th-century French male artists